The 2000 Appalachian State Mountaineers football team was an American football team that represented Appalachian State University as a member of the Southern Conference (SoCon) during the 2000 NCAA Division I-AA football season. In their 12th year under head coach Jerry Moore, the Mountaineers compiled an overall record of 10–4, with a conference mark of 6–2, and finished as SoCon co-champion. Appalachian State advanced to the NCAA Division I-AA Football Championship playoffs, where they upset Troy State in the first round, Western Kentucky in the quarterfinals, and lost to Montana in the semifinals.

Schedule

References

Appalachian State
Appalachian State Mountaineers football seasons
Appalachian State Mountaineers football